Annunciazione della Beata Vergine Maria a Via Ardeatina is a 20th-century parochial church and titular church on the southern edge of Rome, dedicated to the Annunciation and located on the ancient Via Ardeatina.

History 

Annunciazione della Beata Vergine Maria a Via Ardeatina was built in 1985–88, replacing an old church known as Annunziatella due to its small size.

On 5 February 1965, the old Annunziatella was made a titular church to be held by a cardinal-deacon, but was never actually given to a cardinal, until the new church was given a titular in 2001.

Cardinal-Protectors
Mario Francesco Pompedda (2001–2006)
Domenico Calcagno (2012–present)

References

External links

Titular churches
Roman Catholic churches completed in 1987
20th-century Roman Catholic church buildings in Italy
Rome Q. XX Ardeatino